Michael Richard Wittig (born August 21, 1976) is an American Christian musician who is best known as "Kalel", the current bass player for the Dove Awards winning and Grammy nominated Christian hard rock band Pillar. After ten years of playing with Pillar, Wittig left the band in September 2008. He then later returned to the band in 2012. He was also a member of pop rock band Stars Go Dim, with Joey Avalos, Lester Estelle Jr. (former drummer for Pillar) and Chris Cleveland till 2012.

Biography

Musical career
In 1992 he formed a Christian band in his garage. The band was originally called Q: The Source (named after the Q document), but they eventually renamed it as Godspeed for the release of their self-titled EP. Wittig's fellow Godspeed members were Mahlon Tobias and Robert Brouhard.

He graduated from Riverside Polytechnic High School in 1994, and soon left to go to college in Hays, Kansas at Fort Hays State University. While living there he played bass for a Christian Metal band, Tetelestai, which at some point broke up. Wittig sold his vehicle to some locals and made mention of wanting to start a band. This information was passed along to Robert Debes who became Wittig's roommate. During this time, Wittig became involved in another band, named Mishap. Wittig was introduced to Rob Beckley, a vocalist and Travis Jenkins, a guitar player. They formed  Pillar. After playing with Pillar for ten years, Michael Wittig left the band in September 2008 for multiple reasons. While in Pillar, in 2007 Wittig with his friends Lester Estelle, Jr. and Joey Avalos formed pop rock band Stars Go Dim in which he played till 2012 but left due to personal reasons.

Wittig reunited with Pillar in 2012 and began to lay tracks for a new album. In August 2015 their latest album One Love Revolution was released.

Personal life
Michael Wittig has two sons and, as of summer 2010, twin daughters and lives with his wife in Oklahoma.

References

External links

Pillar website
Stars Go Dim on Myspace
Stars Go Dim website

Living people
American rock bass guitarists
American performers of Christian music
Guitarists from Oklahoma
People from Hays, Kansas
Musicians from Riverside, California
1976 births
American heavy metal bass guitarists
American male bass guitarists
Pillar (band) members
Guitarists from California
21st-century American bass guitarists